Seehof may refer to:

Seehof, Germany
Seehof, Switzerland